East Gippsland may refer to one of these overlapping regions in Victoria, Australia:

East Gippsland, a geographic region, which includes the Shire of East Gippsland and may also include Central Gippsland
Shire of East Gippsland, a local government area
Electoral district of Gippsland East of the Victorian Legislative Assembly, covering most of eastern Victoria

See also

 
 
 East (disambiguation)
 Gippsland (disambiguation)